The 1986 Copa Polla Lan Chile was the 16th edition of the Chilean Cup tournament. The competition started on February 22, 1986 and concluded on June 14, 1986. Only first level teams took part in the tournament. Cobreloa won the competition for their first time, beating Fernández Vial in the finals.

Calendar

Group Round

Group North

Group South

Finals

Top goalscorer
Juan Carlos Letelier (Cobreloa) 11 goals

See also
 1986 Campeonato Nacional

Sources
Revista Deporte Total, (Santiago, Chile) February–June 1986 (scores & information)
Diario La Tercera, (Santiago, Chile) February–June 1986 (some scores & information)

Copa Chile
Chile
1986